The Syracuse Orange college football team represents the Syracuse University in the Atlantic Coast Conference (ACC). The Orange compete as part of the NCAA Division I Football Bowl Subdivision. The program has had 30 head coaches since it began play during the 1887 season. Since December 2015, Dino Babers has served as head coach at Syracuse.

Seven coaches have led Syracuse in postseason bowl games: Ben Schwartzwalder, Frank Maloney, Dick MacPherson, Paul Pasqualoni, Doug Marrone, Scott Shafer, and Babers. Two of those coaches also won conference championships: Pasqualoni captured four and Marrone one as a member of the Big East Conference.

Schwartzwalder is the leader in overall wins and seasons coached with 153 wins during his 25 years as head coach. Pete Reynolds has the highest winning percentage at 0.800. Jordan C. Wells has the lowest winning percentage at 0.056. Of the 30 different head coaches who have led the Orange, Frank "Buck" O'Neill, Howard Jones, Tad Jones, Bill Hollenback, Vic Hanson, Clarence Munn, Schwartzwalder, and MacPherson has been inducted into the College Football Hall of Fame.

Key

Coaches

Notes

References

Syracuse

Syracuse Orange football coaches